Sam Waterston is an American actor, producer and director who made his film debut in the 1965 drama movie The Plastic Dome of Norma Jean. Waterston has appeared in numerous films, television shows as well as on stage during his career. One of his early film roles was as a shoe salesman in the television drama film The Glass Menagerie (1973), for which he received a Primetime Emmy Award nomination for Outstanding Supporting Actor in a Drama Series. Waterston went on to appear as bond salesman Nick Carraway in the 1974 feature film version of The Great Gatsby, which earned him two Golden Globe nominations for Best Supporting Actor, and New Star of the Year.

In 1980, Waterston's portrayal of American theoretical physicist J. Robert Oppenheimer in the television miniseries Oppenheimer saw him earn another Golden Globe nomination. Two years later, Waterston played American journalist Sydney Schanberg in the 1984 British drama The Killing Fields, opposite Haing S. Ngor and John Malkovich – for his performance Waterston received an Academy Award for Best Actor nomination. His other biographical roles include Heaven's Gate as Old West figure Frank Canton (1980) and as President Abraham Lincoln in the miniseries Lincoln (1988), the 1990 documentary miniseries The Civil War, and the play Abe Lincoln in Illinois. His performance in the last of these garnered him a nomination for the Tony Award for Best Actor in a Play.

Waterston portrayed a district attorney in drama television series I'll Fly Away (1991–93), for which he won the Golden Globe Award for Best Actor – Television Series Drama. In 1994,  he made his first appearance as district attorney Jack McCoy in the police procedural and legal drama show Law & Order. Waterston went on to become its second longest-running cast member starring in the show till its cancellation in 2010. The role won him a Screen Actors Guild Award for Outstanding Performance by a Male Actor in a Drama Series, and several Emmy, and Golden Globe nominations. He has also made guest appearances as his character in other crime drama series, Homicide: Life on the Street (1997, 99), Exiled: A Law & Order Movie (1998), and spin-offs Law & Order: Special Victims Unit (2000, 07, 10, 18) and Law & Order: Trial by Jury (2005). Waterston portrayed the president of a fictional news corporation on political drama The Newsroom (2012–14).

Waterston has also appeared in a numerous stage productions, both Broadway and off-Broadway, such as La Turista (1967), Halfway Up the Tree (1967), Henry IV, Part 1, as well as Henry IV, Part 2 (1968), Hamlet (1972, 1975–76, 2008), Much Ado About Nothing (1972–73, 2004), The Tempest (1974, 2015), Measure for Measure (1976) and King Lear (2011).

Film

Television

Narrator

Theater

Notes

References

Male actor filmographies
American filmographies